John Harvard is a sculpture in bronze by Daniel Chester French in Harvard Yard, Cambridge, Massachusetts honoring clergyman John Harvard (1607–1638), whose deathbed
bequest to the

recently undertaken by the Massachusetts Bay Colony was so gratefully received that it was consequently ordered 

There being nothing to indicate what John Harvard had looked like, French used a Harvard student collaterally descended from an early Harvard president as inspiration.

The statue's inscriptionis the subject of an arch polemic
traditionally recited for visitors,
questioning whether John Harvard justly merits the honorific founder.
According to a Harvard official, the founding of the college was not the act of one but the work of many, and
John Harvard is therefore considered not the founder, but rather afounder, of the school, though the timeliness and generosity of his contribution have made him the most honored of these.

Tourists often rub the toe of John Harvards left shoe for luck.

Composition

The New York Times described the statue at its unveiling:

John Harvard's gift to the school was £780 andperhaps more importantlyhis 400-volume scholar's library:

That he had died of tuberculosis, at about age thirty,
was one of the few things known about John Harvard at the time of the statue's composition; as dedication orator George Edward Ellis put it:

Historian Laurel Ulrich suggests that John Harvards general composition may have been inspired by Hendrik Goltzius' engraving of Clio, and that  the figure's collar, buttons, tassel, and mustache may have been taken from a portrait of Plymouth Colony Governor Edward Winslow.

History

On June 27, 1883,
at the Commencement Day dinner of Harvard alumni a letter was read
from "a generous benefactor, General Samuel James Bridge, an adopted alumnus of the college":

Bridge specified an "ideal" statue because there was then (as now)
nothing to indicate what John Harvard had looked like;
thus when French began work in September he used Harvard student Sherman Hoar as inspiration for the figure's face.
"In looking about for a type of the early comers to our shores," he wrote, "I chose a lineal descendant of them for my model in the general structure of the face. He has more of what I want than anybody I know."
(Through his father Ebenezer Rockwood Hoarchairman of Harvard's Board of OverseersSherman Hoar was descended from a brother of Harvard's fourth president Leonard Hoar,
as well as from Roger Sherman, a signer of the United States Declaration of Independence and the United States Constitution.)

The commission weighed heavily on French even as the figure neared completion. "I am sometimes scared by the importance of this work. It is a subject that one might not have in a lifetime," wrote the sculptorwho thirty years later would create the statue of Abraham Lincoln for the Lincoln Memorial"and a failure would be inexcusable. As a general thing, my model looks pretty well to me, but there are dark days."

French's final model was ready the following May and realized in bronze by the Henry-Bonnard Bronze Company over the next several months.
The cost was reportedly more than $20,000 (equivalent to $ in ).

The statue was installed"looking wistfully into the western sky", said Harvard president
Charles W. Eliotat
the western end of Memorial Hall on the triangular city block then known as the Delta
.
At its October 15, 1884 unveiling Ellis gave
"a singularly felicitous address, telling the story of the life of John Harvard, who passes so mysteriously across the page of our early history."

In 1920 French wrote
to Harvard president Abbott Lawrence Lowell desiring that the statue be relocated; in 1924
it was moved from Memorial Hall (then the college dining halla
Harvard Lampoon drawing showed John Harvard dismounting his plinth, chair in tow, and holding his nose because he "couldn't stand the smell of 'Mem' any longer")
to its current location on the west side of Harvard Yard's University Hall, facing Harvard Hall, Massachusetts Hall, and the Johnston Gate.
Later that year the Lampoon imagined the frustrations of the metallic, immobile John Harvard surrounded by Harvard undergraduates

though twelve years later David McCord portrayed the founder as satisfied in his stationarity:

A photograph of the statue appeared on the cover of the May 5, 1941 issue of Life magazine.

Sometime in the 1990s tour guides began encouraging visitors to emulate a "student tradition"nonexistentof rubbing the toe of John Harvards left shoe for luck, so that while the statue as a whole is darkly weathered the toe now "gleams almost throbbingly bright, as though from an excruciating inflammation of the bronze."
It is, however, traditional for seniors, as they process to graduation exercises on Commencement Day, to remove their caps as they pass.

The statue is depicted on the United States Postal Service's 1986 John Harvard stamp (part of its Great Americans series).

Seals and inscriptions

The monument's six-foot
granite plinth is by Boston architect Charles Howard Walker.
On its southern side (the side to the viewer's right), in bronze, is the seal of John Harvard's alma mater, the University of Cambridge's Emmanuel College; on the northern side is what Ellis called "that most felicitously chosen of all like devices, the three open books and the veritas of Harvard. The pupil of the one institution was the founder of the other, transferring learning from its foreign home to this once wilderness scene."
On the rear are the words
.

The face of the plinth is inscribed (in letters originally gilt)
words "hardly read before some smartass guide breezily informs the unsuspecting visitor that this is, after all, the 'Statue of the Three Lies (as Douglas Shand-Tucci put it)
because (as is ritually related to freshmen and 

the Court's vote came in 1636, not in the inscription's the latter being merely the year of John Harvard's bequest to the school.

However (Shand-Tucci continues) "the idea of the three lies is at best a fourth, and by far the greater falsehood,"
as detailed in a 1934 letter to the Harvard Crimson from the secretary of the Harvard Corporation and director of the school's then-upcoming Tercentenary Celebration:
{{quote|

The facts as to John Harvard's relation to the founding of the College are not at all in dispute nor can it be said that the statue in front of University Hall does any violence to them.

No likeness of John Harvard having been preserved, the statue
[is an "ideal" representation].

If the founding of a university must be dated to a split second of time, then the founding of Harvard should perhaps be fixed by the fall of the president's gavel in announcing the passage of the vote of October 28, 1636
.
But if the founding is to be regarded as a process rather than as a single event

[then John Harvard, by virtue of his bequest "at the very threshold of the College's existence and going further than any other contribution made up to that time to ensure its permanence"] is clearly entitled to be considered a founder. The General Court...

acknowledged the fact by bestowing his name on the College.

These are all familiar facts and it is well that they should be understood by the sons of Harvard. They are entirely compatible with the inscription on John Harvard's statue. There is no myth to be destroyed. }}

Pranks

The statue became the target of pranks soon after its unveiling.

1884 tarring

In 1884 The Harvard Crimson reported that,
"Some ingenious persons covered the John Harvard statue last night with a coat of tar. The same persons presumably, marked a large '87 on the wall at the entrance of the chapel,"
and in 1886 the Crimson mentions a further incident: "A graduate contributor to the Advocate suggests that the editors of the college papers ferret out the authors of the small disturbances, such as the painting of the John Harvard statue."

1890 painting

Following a May 31, 1890 Harvard athletic victory, front-page headlines in the Boston Morning Globe declared:
"Vandalism at Harvard; statue of John Harvard and college buildings daubed with red paint by drunken students; seniors and faculty indignant... Riotous Mob Ruled the Campus."

The next day the Globe further reported that a Harvard student observing graffiti-removal efforts "declared that no Harvard man ever daubed the impious phrase, 'To  with Yale.' He was of the opinion that a Harvard man would at least soften the profanity by varnishing it with Latin or Greek... Two detectives who were requested to ferret out the perpetrators paid little heed to the discussion on swear words, but kept their eyes on several impressions that had been made on the paint when it was fresh. One thought they were made by a dog's paws, and as several students kept dogs the suspicion was magnified to the importance of a clue. A student, however, told the detectives that according to his view the impressions were made by barefoot boys walking on tip-toe."

Out-of-state newspapers reporting the outrage, and to a greater or lesser degree following the subsequent investigation, included (among many others):
 The World (New York, New York; June2, p.2): "A Jocular Outrage Harvard Students Exceed Decency in Celebrating."
 Evening Gazette (Sterling, Illinois; June2, p.4): "Harvard Students on an Outrageous Tear. Slathers of Red Paint Used. The Fine Statue of the College Founder Ruined by the Crazy Scapegraces."
 Fort Wayne Sentinel (Fort Wayne, Indiana; June2, p.5): "The faculty will expel the criminals and  them if found."
 The Philadelphia Record: "Painted Harvard Red Disgraceful Antics of Rum-Crazed Students. Cambridge is Horrified. The Faculty Bent on Vengeance... Last night the whole college celebrated a wild ... There were suppers, bonfires, fish-horns and a general pandemonium; but, save the insane acts of two of the students, who, overcome with enthusiasm, deliberately threw their dress coats into the bonfire while dancing around the blaze, no great overt act was then commit It was during the small hours that the vandals were  [John Harvards] face, hands, books, and shoes were bright crimson, and his clothes striped like a zebra."

Despite a mass meeting of outraged Harvard men (who insisted the culprits must be outsideers or, failing that, freshmen), the hiring of detectives, and an apparently facetious report that Harvard President Charles W. Eliot was unavailable for comment because he had "gone out in the woods to cut switches" (all Globe, June3), on June22 an anonymous contributor (Globe, p.20) intimated that while "the faculty claim that they have not found out any of the men who did the 'fine art' work... I saw the ringleader on class day showing two very pretty girls around the 'yard'."

Other incidents

In March 1934 Harvard athletes were suspected in the disappearance of Yale's "ugly bulldog mascot", Handsome Dan.
The dog was recovered a few days later, though not before the Harvard Lampoon had photographed him licking John Harvards boots,
which had been smeared with hamburger.
("Dog licks man", a Crimson headline read.)

"Some years ago some students painted [the statue] crimson and our cops caught them red-handed", Deputy Chief of the Harvard University Police Jack W. Morse told The Harvard Crimson in 1984, adding "I've been waiting a long time to use that."
(Crimson is Harvard's school color.)

As the statue's hundredth anniversary approached, Harvard Lampoon president Conan O'Brien predicted that "we'll probably stuff it with cottage cheese, maybe also with some chives."
"I think it’s creative but I wish students would direct their creative energies elsewhere," a Harvard maintenance official said in 2002.

"Idealization" dispute

The challenge of creating an idealized representation of John Harvard was discussed by Ellis at the October 1883 meeting of the Massachusetts Historical Society:

But Society president Robert Charles Winthrop harshly disapproved:

A year later, in his oration before the unveiling of what he called "a simulacrum... a conception of what Harvard might have been in body and lineament, from what we know that he was in mind and in soul", Ellis answered Winthrop's criticism:

Should there ever appear, however,

See also
Statue of John Bridge

Notes

References

Further reading

External links
 Harvard: America's Great University Now Leads the World Life'', vol. 10, no. 18 (May 5, 1941), cover (showing "John Harvard [statue]& Freshman") and pp.22, 8999.
 Josiah Quincy, History of Harvard College (title page showing "Quincy seal")
 Smithsonian American Art MuseumInventory of American SculptureJohn Harvard (sculpture)Detailed technical inventory

1884 establishments in Massachusetts
1884 sculptures
Bronze sculptures in Massachusetts
Harvard University
Monuments and memorials in Massachusetts
Outdoor sculptures in Cambridge, Massachusetts
Sculptures by Daniel Chester French
Sculptures of men in Massachusetts
Statues in Massachusetts
Vandalized works of art in Massachusetts
Books in art